The Hirohata Merc is a 1950s custom car, often called "the most famous custom of the classic era". Setting a style and an attitude, it had a "momentous effect" on custom car builders, appeared in several magazines at the time and has reappeared numerous times since, earning an honorable mention on Rod & Customs "Twenty Best of All Time" list in 1991. The impact may be measured by the fact that, after more than fifty years and numerous owners, it is still known as "the Hirohata Merc".

Construction
Constructed in 1953 for Bob Hirohata, it was designed and built by George and Sam Barris, assisted by Frank Sonzogni. It started out as a 1951 Club Coupe. Nosed, decked, and shaved, the top was chopped four inches in front and seven inches in back, and the vertical B-pillar was reshaped so that it curved forward at the top. The rear window had its posts removed, and was raked steeply forward, requiring a new roof piece to be fabricated. Side trim was replaced with that from a 1952 Buick (the spears), augmented by grille teeth from a 1952 Chevrolet (three per side) and functional scoops. The front wheels are fitted with traditional sombrero ('47-'51 Cadillac) hubcaps.

Skirts were added, fitting flush. Three '51 Ford grilles were used to custom-fabricate one, and the bumper was fitted with dagmars.

Barris used a vee-butted windshield, a very common customizers' trick in that era, rather than a one-piece windshield, which was available on the '53 Merc. He added Appleton spotlights, frenched the headlights (which were fitted with '52 Ford rings), and added '52 Lincoln Capri taillights. The exhaust pipes were routed out through the rear bumper, beneath the taillights, and a pair of radio antennae were frenched into the rear quarter panels.

The Hirohata Merc was painted in two shades of green, a total of thirty coats, which were applied by Junior Conway. The interior was upholstered with tuck-and-rolled naugahyde. The dash, seats, and headliner were white with dark green inserts, matching the exterior lower body color (below the Buick spears).

Later changes
Hirohata later replaced the original Mercury flathead engine with a transplanted Cadillac engine, creating the nickname "Mercillac" ("merk-ill-ack"), in the fashion of rodders of the period, who in the same way created Fordillacs and Studillacs.

In 1955, the Merc made an appearance in the film Running Wild, for which it was painted gold over the original ice green.

Hirohata sold the Merc, and the car changed hands several times. It was eventually purchased by Jim McNiel for $500 in 1959; McNiel used it as a daily driver for years, then placed it into storage. Ultimately, McNiel restored the Merc to her original configuration. The paint was done by Hershel "Junior" Conway at Junior's House of Color.

Magazine appearances 
Hot Rod March 1953
Motor Trend March 1953
Rod & Custom October 1953
Trend Book 109 Custom Cars 1954 Annual
Rodding and Re-styling January 1956
Trend Book 143 Restyle Your Car
Rod & Custom August 1989
Road & Track August 2004
Trend Book 133 Custom Cars 1957 Annua
The Big Book of Barris

See also
Automotive restoration
Kustom (cars)
Lead sled
Von Dutch

Notes

References
Rod & Custom Magazine, 10/53.
jalopyjournal
Barris.com

External links

Mercury vehicles
1950s cars
Kustom Kulture
Individual cars
One-off cars
Historic American Engineering Record in California